Prineville Airport  is a public use airport located three nautical miles (6 km) southwest of the central business district of Prineville, in Crook County, Oregon, United States.  According to the FAA's National Plan of Integrated Airport Systems for 2009–2013, it is classified as a general aviation airport.

Facilities and aircraft 
It has two asphalt paved runways:
10/28 is 5,751 by 75 feet (1,753 x 23 m) and 15/33 is 4,031 by 40 feet (1,229 x 12 m).

For the 12-month period ending December 31, 2013, the airport had 45,672 aircraft operations, an average of 125 per day: 96% general aviation, 3% air taxi, and 1% military. At that time there were 114 aircraft based at this airport: 79% single-engine, 5% multi-engine, 2% jet, 1% helicopter and 13% ultralight.

References

External links 
 flyprineville.com
 Aerial photo as of 26 July 2000 from USGS The National Map
 
 

Airports in Crook County, Oregon
Prineville, Oregon